Kill Yourself or Someone You Love is the second EP by black metal band Krieg. It was recorded live in Bitterfeld, Germany, in 2001.

Track listing

Personnel
Imperial – vocals
Wrath – guitar
SM Daemon – bass
Butcher – drums

2002 EPs
Krieg (band) albums